The men's individual compound competition at the 2009 World Archery Championships took place on 2–9 September 2009 in Ulsan, South Korea. 83 archers competed in the qualification round on 2 September. As there were fewer than 128 entrants, all archers qualified for the 7-round knockout round on 5 September which was drawn according to their qualification round scores. The semi-finals and finals then took place on 9 September.

Second seed Albina Loginova beat Jorina Coetzee in the final.

Seeds
The top 45 qualifiers all received byes to the second round.

Draw

Top half

Section 1

Section 2

Section 3

Section 4

Bottom half

Section 5

Section 6

Section 7

Section 8

Finals

References

2009 World Archery Championships
World